USS North Dakota (BB-29) was a dreadnought battleship of the United States Navy, the second member of the , her only sister ship being . North Dakota was laid down at the Fore River Shipyard in December 1907, was launched in November 1908, and commissioned into the US Navy in April 1910. North Dakota was the first vessel of the US Navy to be named after the 39th state.

North Dakota had a peaceful career; she was present during the United States occupation of Veracruz in 1914, but did not see action. After the United States entered World War I in April 1917, North Dakota remained in the US, training crewmen for the rapidly expanding wartime Navy, and therefore did not see combat. She remained on active duty through the early 1920s, until she was decommissioned under the terms of the Washington Naval Treaty in November 1923, and converted into a radio-controlled target ship. In 1931, she was sold for scrapping and thereafter dismantled.

Design

The two Delaware-class battleships were ordered in response to the British battleship , the first all-big-gun battleship to enter service. The Navy decided that another pair of battleships should be built to counter the perceived superiority of Dreadnought over South Carolina, and so Rear Admiral Washington L. Capps prepared a design for a ship with an additional main battery gun turret to match Dreadnoughts ten guns. But unlike Dreadnought, all ten of North Dakotas guns could fire on the broadside. At the time of her construction, North Dakota was the largest and most powerful battleship then being built in the world.

The ship was powered by two-shaft Curtis steam turbines and fourteen coal-fired Babcock & Wilcox boilers, generating a top speed of 21 knots. She had a crew of 933 officers and men. Her bow had an early example of bulbous forefoot.

The ship was armed with a main battery of ten /45 Mark 5 guns in five twin Mark 7 gun turrets on the centerline, two of which were placed in a superfiring pair forward. The other three turrets were placed aft of the superstructure. The secondary battery consisted of twenty-one /50 Mark 6 guns mounted on Mark 9 and Mark 12 pedestal mounts in casemates along the side of the hull. As was standard for capital ships of the period, she carried a pair of  torpedo tubes, submerged in her hull on the broadside.

Service history

Construction – 1917

The keel for North Dakota was laid down at the Fore River Shipyard in Quincy, Massachusetts, on 16 December 1907. She was launched on 10 November 1908, and completed on 11 April 1910, thereafter being commissioned into the fleet. On 8 September 1910, the ship suffered an oil-tank explosion and fire while at sea. Six men—Chief Watertenders August Holtz and Patrick Reid, Chief Machinist's Mates Thomas Stanton and Karl Westa, Machinist's Mate First Class Charles C. Roberts, and Watertender Harry Lipscomb—each received the Medal of Honor "for extraordinary heroism in the line of his profession" during the fire.

After her commissioning, North Dakota was assigned to the Atlantic Fleet; she participated in the normal peacetime routine of training cruises, fleet maneuvers, and gunnery drills in the Atlantic and in the Caribbean Sea. On 2 November 1910, she crossed the Atlantic for the first time, on a good-will visit to Britain and France. Fleet maneuvers followed in the Caribbean the next spring. Midshipmen training cruises for cadets from the Naval Academy occupied North Dakotas time in the summers of 1912 and 1913. On 1 January 1913, she joined the honor escort for the British armored cruiser , which was carrying the remains of Whitelaw Reid, the United States Ambassador to Great Britain.

The United States remained neutral when war in Europe broke out in August 1914; in the Americas, political disturbances in Mexico during that country's revolution kept the US Navy occupied that year. North Dakota steamed off Veracruz, where she arrived on 26 April 1914, five days after American sailors had occupied the city. She cruised the coast of Mexico to protect Americans in the country until October, when she returned to Norfolk, Virginia, arriving on 16 October. As war loomed, the Atlantic Fleet began intensive training to prepare for a possible American entrance into the conflict.

World War I

North Dakota was conducting gunnery training in Chesapeake Bay when the United States declared war on Germany on 6 April 1917. Unlike her sister , North Dakota remained in American waters for the duration of the war, and did not see action. She was based out of York River, Virginia and New York City, and was tasked with training gunners and engine room personnel for the rapidly expanding wartime fleet. Admiral Hugh Rodman requested that North Dakota remain behind because he did not trust the reliability of her engines. In 1917, her engines were replaced with new geared turbines, and new fire control equipment was installed.

On 13 November 1919, North Dakota left Norfolk, carrying the remains of the Italian Ambassador to the United States, Vincenzo Macchi di Cellere, who had died 20 October in Washington, D.C. The ship stopped in Athens, Constantinople, Valencia, and Gibraltar while cruising the Mediterranean Sea. She thereafter returned to the United States, and participated in fleet maneuvers in the Caribbean in the spring of 1920. In July 1921, she was present during the joint Army-Navy bombing tests, where the ex-German battleship  and cruiser  were sunk in an air-power demonstration. North Dakota returned to the normal peacetime routine of training exercises, including two midshipmen cruises in the summers of 1922 and 1923; the latter cruise went to European waters, where she visited Spain, Scotland, and Scandinavia.

In the years immediately following the end of the war, the United States, Britain, and Japan all launched huge naval construction programs. All three countries decided that a new naval arms race would be ill-advised, and so convened the Washington Naval Conference to discuss arms limitations, which produced the Washington Naval Treaty, signed in February 1922. North Dakota was decommissioned on 22 November 1923 in Norfolk in accordance with the terms of the treaty. She was disarmed and reclassified as an "unclassified" ship on 29 May 1924, and thereafter converted into a radio-controlled gunnery target ship. Her turbines were removed for later use aboard the battleship  when she was modernized in the 1930s. She served in that capacity until 1930, when she was replaced by the battleship . She was stricken from the Naval Vessel Register on 7 January 1931 and sold to the Union Shipbuilding Co of Baltimore on 16 March 1931 for dismantling.

Footnotes

Notes

Citations

References

External links

Delaware-class battleships
Ships built in Quincy, Massachusetts
1908 ships
World War I battleships of the United States